Pampatemnus is an extinct genus of notoungulate belonging to the family Isotemnidae that lived during the Early to Middle Eocene of what is now Argentina.

Etymology

The genus name, Pampatemnus, is composed of the prefix Pampa-, the Quechua word for "plain", and the suffix -temnus, from the greek word Τεμγυς, meaning "groove", a suffix commonly used by Florentino Ameghino to name genera of Isotemnidae.

Description

Pampatemnus was discovered in outcrops of the Lumbrera Formation, an Eocene geological formation located in the Guachipas Department of the Salta Province. Two species attributed to the genus have been described : Pampatemnus infernalis and Pampatemnus deuterus. The species name infernalis was given to honor the Legion Infernal, a gaucho regiment who took an important role in the Spanish American wars of independence, while the name deuterus refers to the two species discovery order.

References

Toxodonts
Eocene mammals of South America
Paleogene Argentina
Fossils of Argentina
Fossil taxa described in 1982
Prehistoric placental genera